Cephrenes is a genus of skipper butterflies in the family Hesperiidae.
The genus is shared between the Indomalayan realm and the Australasian realm. Larvae feed on a variety of palms (Arecaceae) especially Cocos nucifera (coconut), and Calamus (rattan).

Species
Cephrenes acalle (Hopffer, 1874) Sulawesi, Borneo
Cephrenes augiades (Felder, 1860)
Cephrenes carna Evans, 1934 New Guinea
Cephrenes moseleyi (Butler, 1884) New Guinea
Cephrenes trichopepla (Lower, 1908)

References
Natural History Museum Lepidoptera genus database

External links
Cephrenes at funet

Taractrocerini
Hesperiidae genera